"Leopard-Skin Pill-Box Hat" is a song by Bob Dylan, from his 1966 album Blonde on Blonde. The song features a surreal, playful lyric set to an electric blues accompaniment. "Leopard-Skin Pill-Box Hat" peaked at number 81 on the American Billboard Top 100 chart in June 1967. The song was regularly featured on the set list for Dylan's renowned 1966 concert tour.

Lyrics
Dylan's lyrics affectionately ridicule a female "fashion victim" who wears a leopard-skin pillbox hat. The pillbox hat was a fashionable ladies' hat in the United States in the early to mid-1960s, most famously worn by Jacqueline Kennedy. Dylan satirically crosses this accessory's high-fashion image with leopard-skin material, perceived as more downmarket and vulgar. The song was also written and released after pillbox hats had been at the height of fashion.

Some journalists and Dylan biographers have speculated that the song was inspired by Edie Sedgwick, an actress and model associated with Andy Warhol. It has been suggested that Sedgwick was an inspiration for other Dylan songs of the time as well, particularly some from Blonde on Blonde.

Influences
The song melodically and lyrically resembles Lightnin' Hopkins's "Automobile Blues", with Dylan's opening line of "Well, I see you got your brand new leopard-skin pill-box hat," echoing Hopkins's "I saw you riding 'round in your brand new automobile".

Recording sessions
The song was one of the first compositions attempted by Dylan and the Hawks when in January 1966 they went into Columbia recording studios in New York City to record material for the Blonde on Blonde album. The song was attempted on January 25 (2 takes) and January 27 (4 takes), but no recording was deemed satisfactory. One of the takes from January 25 was released in 2005 on The Bootleg Series Vol. 7: No Direction Home: The Soundtrack.

Frustrated with the lack of progress made with the Hawks in the New York sessions (only one song, "One of Us Must Know (Sooner or Later)", had been successfully realized), Dylan relocated to Nashville, Tennessee, in February 1966, where the evening of the first day of recording (February 14) was devoted to "Leopard-Skin Pill-Box Hat". Present at the session were Charlie McCoy (guitar and bass), Kenny Buttrey (drums), Wayne Moss (guitar), Joe South (guitar and bass), Al Kooper (organ), Hargus Robbins (piano) and Jerry Kennedy (guitar). Earlier in the day Dylan and the band had achieved satisfactory takes of "Fourth Time Around" and "Visions of Johanna" (which were included on the album), but none of the 13 takes of "Leopard-Skin Pill-Box Hat" recorded on February 14 were to Dylan's satisfaction. Dylan soon left Nashville to play some concerts with the Hawks. He returned in March for a second set of sessions. A satisfactory take of "Leopard-Skin Pill-Box Hat" was finally achieved in the early hours of March 10, 1966, by Dylan along with Kenny Buttrey, Henry Strzelecki on bass, and the Hawks's Robbie Robertson on lead guitar (though Dylan himself plays lead guitar on the song's opening 12 bars).

The recording sessions were released in their entirety on the 18-disc Collector's Edition of The Bootleg Series Vol. 12: The Cutting Edge 1965–1966 on November 6, 2015, with highlights from the February 14, 1966, outtakes appearing on the 6-disc and 2-disc versions of that album.

Live performances
According to his website, Dylan played "Leopard-Skin Pill-Box Hat" 535 times in concert from 1966 to 2013. A live version from May 17, 1966 was included on The Bootleg Series Vol. 4: Bob Dylan Live 1966, The "Royal Albert Hall" Concert (1998).

Personnel
The personnel for the album version were as follows.

Musicians
Bob Dylanvocals, electric guitar, harmonica
Charlie McCoyacoustic guitar
Robbie Robertsonelectric guitar
Wayne Mosselectric guitar
Joe Southelectric guitar
Al Kooperorgan
Hargus Robbinspiano
Henry Strzeleckielectric bass
Kenneth Buttreydrums

Technical
Bob Johnstonproduction

Charts

References 

Sources

External links
 Lyrics, from bobdylan.com
 EDLIS Twice

1966 songs
1967 singles
Bob Dylan songs
Columbia Records singles
Song recordings produced by Bob Johnston
Songs written by Bob Dylan